Hans Pichler; (1882–1958) was an Austrian-born German philosopher. A student of Windelband and Meinong, he revived in his work the philosophy of Wolff contra the epistemologism of the Neo-Kantians, particularly in his Über Christian Wolffs Ontologie (1910). Among those influenced by Pichler's turn to realist ontology was Nicolai Hartmann.

1882 births
1958 deaths
Ontologists
German male writers
20th-century German philosophers
Austro-Hungarian emigrants to Germany